Robert Wylie Hill (1851–1939) was a Scottish importer and retailer who founded the Wylie Hill department store in Glasgow.

In the mid 1870s, Wylie Hill was in south America on an expedition to collect exotic birds. It was probably then that he met Neil Ross McKinnon of British Guiana, who was of Scottish descent, and who later entrusted Wylie Hill with the sale in Britain of his valuable collection of the postage stamps of the colony that included the famous British Guiana 1c magenta stamp.

References

External links 
https://www.heraldscotland.com/news/12151054.major-seeks-permission-to-tear-down-mansion/

1851 births
1939 deaths
Scottish businesspeople
Glasgow
British retail chief executives